Ersephila is a genus of moths in the family Geometridae described by George Duryea Hulst in 1896.

Species
 Ersephila grandipennis Hulst, 1896
 Ersephila indistincta Hulst, 1898

References

Geometridae